Václav Vydra (born January 7, 1956) is a Czech theater, television and film actor. He was born as the son of Václav Vydra and Dana Medřická. His grandfather Václav Vydra was also a notable actor in Czechoslovakia and Director of the National Theater from 1945 to 1949.

Vydra has worked in several theater associations, such as in the theater in Kladno, Mladá Boleslav and later in urban theaters of Prague.

He has made nearly 60 appearances in television and film in the Czech Republic.

Filmography
2008 – Vy nám taky, šéfe!
2005 - Kameňák 3
2004 - Kameňák 2
2003 - Kameňák
2001 - Z pekla štěstí 2
1999 - Z pekla štěstí
1997 - Zdivočelá země
1996 - Pinocchiova dobrodružství
1995 - Má je pomsta | Učitel tance
1994 - Helimadoe | V erbu lvice
1993 - Jedna kočka za druhou | Kaspar Hauser
1992 - Černí baroni
1991 - Skús ma objať | Tankový prapor
1988 - Dobří holubi se vracejí | Oznamuje se láskám vašim
1987 - Copak je to za vojáka... | Zuřivý reportér
1986 - Salar
1984 - S čerty nejsou žerty
1982 - Fandy, ó Fandy | Poslední propadne peklu
1980 - Půl domu bez ženicha | V hlavní roli Oldřich Nový
1973 - Přijela k nám pouť
1970 - Zabil jsem Einsteina, pánové

External links

Official site 

1956 births
Living people
Czech male film actors
Czech male stage actors
Czech male television actors
Male actors from Prague